Michael Mehrdad Latifi (born October 1962 in Iran) is an Iranian-Canadian businessman. He is the owner, Chairman and CEO of Sofina Foods Inc., a Markham, Ontario-based manufacturer of processed animal products. Sofina acquired Lilydale in a C$130 million deal in 2010, and Santa Maria Foods ULC, an importer and distributor of specialty Italian brands, in 2012.

Through the investment company Nidala (BVI) Limited, which is controlled by Latifi, he invested £200 million (around 270 million USD or C$350 million) in McLaren Group.

Michael is the father of racing driver Nicholas Latifi, former driver for the Williams Formula One team.

References

Canadian businesspeople
Living people
McLaren people
Canadian people of Iranian descent
1962 births